Pseudoalteromonas byunsanensis is a marine bacterium "isolated from tidal flat sediment of Byunsan, South Korea."

References

External links

Type strain of Pseudoalteromonas byunsanensis at BacDive -  the Bacterial Diversity Metadatabase

Alteromonadales
Bacteria described in 2005